Allan Cumming (born 21 March 1996) is a South African hammer thrower. He won the gold medal at the 2022 African Championships.

His personal best is 73.00 metres, set in 2021 in Potchefstroom, South Africa.

Career
Cumming finished fourth at the 2015 African Junior Championships in Ethiopia, narrowly missing out on the podium. That same year he began competing at the collegiate level for North-West University, breaking the Varsity Sports record with a personal best throw of 58.13 m at his maiden meet in Stellenbosch. He was selected for his first senior international competition, the 2018 African Championships held in Nigeria, though he finished in sixth place after throwing for 67.37 m.

In 2019, Cumming won a bronze medal at the South African Championships before placing eighth at the Summer Universiade in Italy. Cumming won his first senior national title at the 2021 South African Championships, recording a throw of 72.78 m to defeat incumbent champion Tshepang Makhethe. He also won the national university title with a throw of 70.89 m, contributing to North-West University's fifth consecutive  team title.

Cumming achieved the double again in 2022, capturing the national title in April and the national university title in May. Then, in June, he captured the continental title at the African Championships in Mauritius with a throw of 69.13 m in the final round, finishing just ahead of Tshepang Makhethe for the gold medal.

Personal life
Cumming's sister, Margo, is the national record holder in the women's hammer throw. The duo both won national championships in 2021.

Cumming earned his Bachelor of Education (BEd) from North-West University.

Achievements
All information taken from World Athletics profile.

Personal bests

International competitions

National championships

National titles
 South African Championships
 Hammer throw: 2021, 2022

  Championships
 Hammer throw: 2021, 2022

References

External links
 

Living people
1996 births
South African male hammer throwers
South African Athletics Championships winners
African Championships in Athletics winners
Competitors at the 2019 Summer Universiade
North-West University alumni
20th-century South African people
21st-century South African people